Oliver Wyman (born July 20) is an American voice actor, known for his work in animation, television and video games.

He is also known by the alias of Pete Zarustica.

Career
In anime and video games, Wyman voiced the characters Morty Oyamada, Zang-Ching and Boris Tepes Dracula III from Shaman King, and Big the Cat in the Sonic the Hedgehog franchise.

He has also narrated over 350 audiobooks. Wyman is a narrator who has won four Audie Awards from the Audio Publisher's Association, twenty-one Earphone Awards from AudioFile, and two Listen Up Awards from Publishers Weekly.

Filmography

Film

Anime

Animation

Video games

Web

Audiobook narration
 Atomic Lobster by Tim Dorsey
 Beyond the Blue Event Horizon by Frederik Pohl
 By Schism Rent Asunder by David Weber (Safehold series).
 Gateway by Frederik Pohl
 Heechee Rendezvous by Frederik Pohl
 Hot, Flat, and Crowded: Why We Need a Green Revolution—And How It Can Renew America by Thomas Friedman
 Interface by Neal Stephenson and J. Frederick George
 Island of the Sequined Love Nun by Christopher Moore
 It's Not About the Bike by Lance Armstrong
 A Million Little Pieces by James Frey
 Monster Hunter Alpha by Larry Correia
 Monster Hunter International by Larry Correia
 Monster Hunter Vendetta by Larry Correia
 Nuclear Jellyfish by Tim Dorsey
 Off Armageddon Reef by David Weber (Safehold series).
 Practical Demonkeeping by Christopher Moore
 Ricky Ricotta's Mighty Robot (series) by Dav Pilkey and Dan Santat
 The World Is Flat: A Brief History of the Twenty-First Century by Thomas Friedman

Awards

Audie Awards

Earphone Awards

Listen Up Awards

References

External links

 
 

Living people
American male video game actors
American male voice actors
1966 births